Seeq Corporation is a software company, founded in 2013 and headquartered in Seattle, Washington, United States. Seeq provides software with advanced analytics capabilities to the industrial process manufacturing sector including pharmaceutical, oil and gas, mining and minerals, pulp and paper, energy and utilities, IIoT, and chemical industries among others. Seeq's browser-based software is designed specifically for use with time series data, which is most often aggregated in data historians such as OSIsoft's PI system, Inductive Automation's Ignition system and other similar data historians such as Emerson's Ovation and DeltaV, GE Proficy, Honeywell's Uniformance PHD, Wonderware, and AspenTech IP.21, as well as many others.

Seeq's multiple applications allow organizations to analyze their data to improve business outcomes. Workbench, one of Seeq's applications, includes data visualization, data modeling, and interactive tools for diagnostic, monitoring, predictive and descriptive analytics. It also includes Google-like search, knowledge-capture and collaboration tools. Seeq Organizer is used to create documents that assemble analyses and visualizations into reports, presentations, and meeting agendas. Organizer documents are dynamic because they tie directly to the underlying data, and are “time relative” so they can be defined by any batch, shift, day, etc. Seeq Runtime performs continuous data cleansing, boundary management, and streaming calculations on historian data. The runtime, which is accessed through either Seeq Workbench or the Seeq REST API, runs autonomously and may be integrated with existing alarm systems or dashboard solutions.

Seeq can be set up and running on a dedicated server, server cluster, or virtual machine in as little time as an hour. On-premise installations on the same network as a plant or enterprise historian, or on the cloud (Microsoft Azure, Amazon Web Services, etc.), or on a mixed environment of on-premise and cloud resources are supported. Seeq is extensible through data export, data integration, and a REST API for creating custom templates and modules. Data export options include Microsoft Excel and PowerPoint, and any OData client (Tableau, Microsoft PowerBI, etc.). Data integration with OSIsoft Vision is supported, and the REST API has SDKs for programming in C#, Python, MatLab, and Java. Seeq does not copy or duplicate data from the source of record. Instead, data is accessed via a connector retrieving data on the fly based on user actions. All Seeq documents such as workbooks, worksheets, topics, and search definitions are stored by Seeq for easy user access and sharing.

References

External links 
 Company Website
 Windpower Engineering and Development October 20, 2017 Article

Data visualization software
Business software
Data analysis software
Companies based in Seattle
Data companies